The Varna Shipyard  is one of the oldest shipyards in Bulgaria. It is located in Varna in the south-eastern part of the town. It is one of three active shipyards in Bulgaria.

History 
The shipyard was founded in 1907. Originally, the owner built boats and motorboats from six to nine meters in length. In 1937, the passenger ship Galata was built there. After 1945, it was renamed to Georgi Dimitrov Shipbuilding Plant. The 100,000-ton tanker Khan-Asparukh was manufactured there in 1977. It was later renamed to Bulyard Shipbuilding.

In 1986–1990, several multipurpose ships of 17,000 tons, container ships, bulk carriers were built. A significant part of the orders were fulfilled for the USSR, Poland, Czechoslovakia, Hungary and China.

Facilities 
Large dock 237mx40mx7m with two thin tall (yellowish sunset gold) Ardelt Krupp (DE, Eberswald ? EKW ) gantry cranes (300 550 ? ton lift each)
Small Dock Camera 187mx28mx6m
Corps-forming workshop
Sole-welding workshop

References 

Shipbuilding companies of Bulgaria
1907 establishments in Bulgaria